This is a list of seasons completed by the Cleveland Gladiators. The Gladiators were a professional arena football franchise of the Arena Football League (AFL) based in Cleveland, Ohio. The franchise was originally known as the New Jersey Red Dogs formed as an expansion team in 1997 and based in East Rutherford, New Jersey as a member of the Arena Football League (AFL). Before the 2001 season, the franchise was sold to Jim Ferraro, who changed the team's name to the New Jersey Gladiators. 

In 2003, Ferraro moved the team to Las Vegas, Nevada with a few weeks to the start of the season. The league had already devised the schedules; therefore, the Gladiators would play their 2003 season in the Eastern Division of the National Conference, before shifting in 2004 to the American Conference's Western Division. The team went 31–50 in five years in Las Vegas, making the playoffs once. After the 2007 season, the franchise relocated to Cleveland, Ohio. The team was also moved back to the National League's Eastern Division. In the 2008 season, the franchise went to their first Conference Championship game which they lost to Philadelphia Soul.

In 2009, the AFL announced that it had suspended operations indefinitely and canceled the 2009 season. Later in 2009 the Gladiators announced they would return to play in 2010, as a part of the league's relaunching.

However, they were defeated in ArenaBowl XXVII by the Arizona Rattlers.

Note: The Finish, Wins, and Losses columns list regular season results and exclude any postseason play. This list documents the season–by–season records of the Gladiators' franchise from 1997 to present, including postseason records, and league awards for individual players or head coaches.

Notes

References
 
 
 
 
 
 

Cleveland Gladiators
Seasons
Gladiators seasons
Ohio sports-related lists
Nevada sports-related lists
New Jersey sports-related lists